The Accounts of Jingkang is a series of Chinese books written in the Southern Song dynasty by various authors. The books recorded the fall of Northern Song dynasty to the Jurchen-led Jin dynasty in the Jin–Song Wars and its aftermath. They are credited to be one of the most detailed accounts of the Jingkang Incident of 1127, when the Jin dynasty captured the Northern Song capital of Kaifeng and abducted the Emperor Qinzong of Song, and his father, the abdicated Emperor Huizong of Song.

Formation 
There are 7 books in the series:
 Tales of the Green Palace (青宮譯語)
 Expedition to the South (南征錄彙)
 Moaning (呻吟語)
 Accounts in Kaifeng (開封府狀)
 Tour of Duty to Jin in 1119 - 1125 AD (宣和乙巳奉使金國行程錄)
 Records of the Song Captives (宋俘記)
 Tales of a man in bottle (甕中人語)

External links
 The Accounts of Jingkang. Retrieved on 2008-03-10.

Song dynasty literature